The 2016 Chorley Borough Council election took place on 5 May 2016 to elect members of Chorley Borough Council in England. This was on the same day as other local elections.

Council make-up
After the election, the composition of the council was:

Election result

Results map

Wards

Adlington and Anderton

Brindle and Hoghton ward

Chorley East ward

Chorley North East ward

Chorley North West ward

Chorley South East ward

Chorley South West ward

Clayton-le-Woods and Whittle-le-Woods ward

Clayton-le-Woods North ward

Coppull ward

Eccleston and Mawdesley ward

Euxton North ward

Heath Charnock and Rivington ward

Lostock ward

Wheelton and Withnell ward

`

References

2016 English local elections
2016
2010s in Lancashire